Sir William Cunningham Bruce, 9th Baronet  (20 September 1825 – 29 May 1906) was a Scottish first-class cricketer.

The son of William Cunningham Bruce and Jane Catherine Clark, he was born in British India at Bombay in September 1825. Bruce served in the British Army with the 74th Highlanders, reaching the rank of captain. A keen cricketer, he made two appearances in first-class cricket for the Gentlemen of Kent against the Gentlemen of England at Canterbury in 1844 and 1846. He scored 23 runs in his two first-class matches, with a high score of 12. Bruce succeeded his uncle, Sir Michael Bruce, as the 9th Baronet of the Bruce baronets upon his death in December 1862. He was a magistrate for Stirlingshire and served as a deputy lieutenant for the county. Bruce died in England at Windsor in May 1906. Upon his death, he was succeeded as the 10th Baronet by his son, Sir William Waller Bruce, one of three children he had with Charlotte Isabella O'Grady, who he married in 1850.

References

External links

1825 births
1906 deaths
People from Mumbai
74th Highlanders officers
Scottish cricketers
Gentlemen of Kent cricketers
Baronets in the Baronetage of Nova Scotia
Scottish justices of the peace
Deputy Lieutenants of Stirlingshire